This is a list of all tornadoes that were confirmed by local offices of the National Weather Service in the United States in May 2013.

United States yearly total

May

May 2 event

May 4 event

May 6 event

May 7 event

May 8 event

May 9 event

May 10 event

May 15 event

May 16 event

May 17 event

May 18 event

May 19 event

May 20 event

May 21 event

May 23 event

May 25 event

May 26 event

May 27 event

May 28 event

May 29 event

May 30 event

May 31 event

See also
Tornadoes of 2013

Notes

References

Tornadoes of 2013
2013 natural disasters in the United States
2013-5
May 2013 events in the United States